S3500 may refer to :

Products
 FinePix S3500, a 2005 digital camera with a 6x optical zoom lens by FujiFilm
 COOLPIX S3500, a 2002 digital camera from Nikon
 s3500t and s3500z, two HP Pavilion Slimline desktop computer models
 DC S3500, an Intel SSD

Other uses
 S3500 expressway; see List of Regional Expressways of China

See also

 3500 (disambiguation)